Aw family is the family member of Aw Chu Kin and his descendant. Aw Chu Kin started his business in Burma, which his two sons expanded it into a multi-national conglomerate that from Chinese medicines to newspaper, as well as bank, insurance and real estate. However, the family started to decline in the third generation, by the takeover of family-owned listed company Haw Par Brothers International in Singapore in 1971, which saw Sin Poh (Star News) Amalgamated, Chung Khiaw Bank and Haw Par Brothers (Thailand) were spin-off from the listed company. Before the dismantle, the key position of the business empire was served by third-generation member and their spouse, which they were removed after the takeover. However, Sally Aw, granddaughter of Aw Chu Kin, remained as one of the influential media tycoon in Hong Kong in 1990s, until forced to sell her Sing Tao Holdings in 1999 due to financial difficulties.

In 1985, the family owned Haw Par Villa was given to the government of Singapore.

Members
Note: starting from the fourth generation, not all member were listed

First generation
 Aw Chu Kin

Second generation
 Aw Boon Leng  eldest brother, died at young age
 Aw Boon Haw, have 4 wives, 7 sons and 2 daughters
 Aw Boon Par

Third generation
 Dato Aw Kow D.K.L.P., B.B.M., adopted son of Aw Boon Haw; he was the managing director of Sin Chew Jit Poh and the owner of Eastern Sun; he was invited to the Fujian Provincial Assembly in 1947; he married Tan (also known as Datin Aw Kow), daughter of a pastor from the Methodist church; she chaired Estern Sun. He died on 1 March 1982
 Aw Swan: general manager of Sin Poh (Star News) Amalgamated of Singapore in 1971–72; removed from the position in Sin Poh Amalgamated (Hong Kong) in 1952; renounced by Aw Boon Haw as adopted son in 1952
 Aw Hoe: managing director of Singapore Tiger Standard, died in a plane crash in January 1951, adopted son of Aw Boon Haw
 Sally Aw (Aw Sian) O.B.E., adopted daughter of Aw Boon Haw, chairwoman of Sing Tao Holdings until 1999; she replaced Aw Swan to manage Sing Tao since 1952
 Dato Aw It Haw D.P.M.S., son of Aw Boon Haw, chairman of Haw Par Brothers (Private) Limited after the death of his cousin Aw Cheng Chye in August 1971, director of Sin Chew Jit Poh (Singapore) Limited and Chung Khiaw Bank; first person in Malaya Peninsula to fly a plane from England to Singapore alone (5,000 km) in 1958; died in 1995
 Aw Jee Haw, son of Aw Boon Haw, killed during WW2 by Japanese bombs at young age
 Aw Sar Haw, son of Aw Boon Haw, died at young age
 Aw Sin Haw / Aw Si Haw / Aw See Haw, son of Aw Boon Haw
 Aw Seng, daughter of Aw Boon Haw

 Dato Aw Cheng Chye S.P.M.J., B.B.M., son of Aw Boon Par, chairman of Haw Par Brothers (Private), Haw Par Brothers International, Sin Poh (Star News) Amalgamated and director of Chung Khiaw Bank and many companies. Married to Tay Chwee Sian (Datin Aw Cheng Chye), director of Sin Chew Jit Poh (Singapore) Limited from 1975 to 1978
 Aw Cheng Taik, son of Aw Boon Par, managing director of Singapore Tiger Standard after the death of Aw Hoe; was general manager in 1950. Still served as a director of charity organization "Haw Par Music Foundation Limited", founded by Sally Aw as of 2017.
 Aw Cheng Hu (also known as Datin Lee Chee Shan, or Emma Aw), eldest daughter of Aw Boon Par, married to Dato Lee Chee Shan, first cousin once removed of Aw Boon Haw, the lifetime president (managing director) of Chung Khiaw Bank until he was retired in July 1971, Lee died in 1986. Aw Cheng Hu was the vice-chairman of Singapore Sōgetsu-ryū Association. Both Lee and Aw Cheng Hu were said to be philanthropists. Aw Cheng Hu said to be die in a house of Housing and Development Board in 2010
 Aw Cheng Sin, daughter of Aw Boon Par, also known as her Thai name after naturalization, Suri Santipongchai, married to Lee Aik Sim (Lee A. Santipongchai), were the directors of Haw Par Brothers (Thailand) until resignation in 1972; owned and operated Thai newspaper Sing Sian Yer Pao (publishes in Chinese language) until 2010

Fourth generation
 Aw Toke Tone (Fred Aw), son of Aw Hoe, managing director of Hongkong Tiger Standard (as early as 1960s to ?), director and minority shareholder of Sing Tao after it became a listed company
 Allan Aw, son of Aw Hoe, auditor (and Office Managing Partner) of Arthur Andersen Hong Kong, member of the Council of The Stock Exchange of Hong Kong from 1999 to ?
 Marcia Aw, daughter of Aw Hoe, executive director of Changing Young Lives Foundation (was a branch of Save the Children in Hong Kong)

, daughter of Aw Swan, managing director of Sin Poh (Star News) Amalgamated (Malaysia) Sendirian Berhad

 Joyce Aw, daughter of Aw Kow (ex-wife of Peter Tham)

 Aw Toke Soon, son of Aw Cheng Chye, director of Sin Chew Jit Poh (Singapore) Limited from 1975 to 1978, president of a surfing club in 1970s.
 Aw Toke Ghee, son of Aw Cheng Chye, businessman, born August 1952
 Aw Ai Sim, daughter of Aw Cheng Chye, a veterinarian.

 , daughter of Lee A. Santipongchai and Suri Santipongchai, managing director of Sing Sian Yer Pao in the 2000s.

 Teng Gee Sigurðsson née Lee daughter of Aw Cheng Hu and Lee Chee Shan. Married to Jón Baldur Sigurðsson. Founded a mime school in Iceland in 1969. She lived with her husband and two children

Fifth generation
 May Chu Harding née Lee, granddaughter of Lee Chee Shan co-author of autobiography Escape from Paradise

Products

Balm
 Tiger Balm

Newspapers
Aw Boon Haw, his son Aw Kow, his daughter Sally Aw and his nephew Aw Cheng Taik had founded several newspapers, but non of them were owned by the family at present:

Star Newspapers
 Sing Tao Daily (Hong Kong)
 Sing Tao Daily (Canada) Toronto and Vancouver 
 Sing Tao Daily (New York City, United States)
 Sing Tao Wan Pao (Hong Kong, evening newspaper, defunct in 1996)
 Sin Chew Jit Poh (Singapore) (split with its Malaysia edition in 1975, defunct in 1983 by a merger)
 Sin Chew Daily (Petaling Jaya, Malaysia)
 Sin Pin Jit Poh (Penang, Malaysia)
 Sin Chung Jit Poh (Singapore)
 Sing Sian Yer Pao (Bangkok, Thailand)
 Sing Thai Wan Pao (evening edition)
 Sing Ming Jih Pao, (Fuzhou, China, defunct circa 1949–50)
 Sing Wah Jih Pao (Shantou, China, now defunct)
 Sing Kwong Jih Pao (Xiamen, China, now defunct)
English newspapers
 Hongkong Tiger Standard
 Singapore Tiger Standard (defunct in 1959)
 Eastern Sun (Singapore, founded by Aw Kow, defunct in 1971)

Chinese newspaper
 (Kuala Lumpur, Malaysia, founded by Aw Cheng Taik in 1959, defunct in 1961)
 Express News (Hong Kong, founded by Sally Aw on 1 March 1963, defunct on 16 March 1998)
 Shenxing Times, financial newspaper in a collaboration with the Shenzhen Special Zone Daily, published between 1994 and 1999

References

 
Business families of Singapore
Families of Hong Kong
Burmese families